Richmond West is a census-designated place (CDP) in Miami-Dade County, Florida, United States. The population was 35,884 at the 2020 census, up from 31,973 at the 2010 census.

History
Richmond West has its origins as an early 1900s settlement named Eureka. In 1907, the one-room Eureka Schoolhouse was built at the corner of S.W. 147th Avenue (Naranja Road) and S.W. 184th Street (Eureka Drive). It closed in 1916 when it and six other area one-room schoolhouses were consolidated into the Redland Farm Life School four miles to the south. In 1927, the Seaboard Air Line Railway arrived, building a depot in the settlement, by then known as Richmond. Although the depot has long since been demolished, the railroad line, now owned by Seaboard's successor CSX, remains.

The 1945 Homestead hurricane caused an estimated $50,000,000-worth of damage, impacting the area. Nearly half of the financial loss happened at the neighboring Richmond Naval Air Station, where winds ignited a fire at three hangars, destroying 25 blimps, 366 planes and 150 automobiles.

The area remained mostly agricultural until the mid-1980s, when several sub-developments and the Dadeland Mobile Home Park were built south of S.W. 152nd Street (Coral Reef Drive). In August 1992, Hurricane Andrew destroyed the mobile home park and devastated the surrounding area. Many of the homes and businesses in the area were completely destroyed. In subsequent years, the area was gradually rebuilt, and development proceeded southward to the community's southern border at Eureka Drive.

Geography
It is bordered to the north by Country Walk, and Zoo Miami is in part of the square mile to the east.

Demographics

2020 census

At the 2020 United States census, there were 35,884 people, 9,861 households and 8,745 families residing in the CDP.

2000 census
At the 2000 census, there were 28,082 people, 7,833 households and 7,175 families residing in the CDP. The racial make-up of the CDP was 78.33% White (18.8% were Non-Hispanic White,) 8.51% African American, 0.21% Native American, 2.29% Asian, 0.06% Pacific Islander, 6.49% from other races and 4.10% from two or more races. Hispanic or Latino of any race were 70.02% of the population.

There were 7,833 households, of which 59.0% had children under the age of 18 living with them, 75.7% were married couples living together, 11.2% had a female householder with no husband present and 8.4% were non-families. 4.9% of all households were made up of individuals and 0.7% had someone living alone who was 65 years of age or older. The average household size was 3.59 and the average family size was 3.69.

32.9% of the population were under the age of 18, 7.4% from 18 to 24, 38.5% from 25 to 44, 16.0% from 45 to 64 and 5.2% were 65 years of age or older. The median age was 31 years. For every 100 females, there were 95.5 males. For every 100 females age 18 and over, there were 91.2 males.

The median household income was $59,608 and the median family income for a family was $59,551. Males had a median income of $36,589 and females $26,896. The per capita income was $18,544.  About 3.9% of families and 5.6% of the population were below the poverty line, including 6.7% of those under age 18 and 5.0% of those age 65 or over.

Speakers of Spanish as a first language accounted for 73.23% of residents, while English made up 24.48%, and French  1.66%.

Richmond West had the 17th-highest percentage of Cuban Americans in the US (29.30%), the 130th-highest percentage of Puerto Ricans (7.28%), the 21st-highest percentage of Colombians i(5.13%), the seventh-highest percentage of Nicaraguans (4.19%), the 54th-highest percentage of Dominicans (2.48%), the 41st-highest percentage of Jamaicans (3.20%), the 28th-highest percentage of Peruvians (1.80%, tied with North Miami Beach) and the 12th-highest percentage of Venezuelans (1.36%).

References

Census-designated places in Miami-Dade County, Florida
Census-designated places in Florida